Meath West is a parliamentary constituency represented in Dáil Éireann, the lower house of the Irish parliament or Oireachtas. The constituency elects 3 deputies (Teachtaí Dála, commonly known as TDs) on the system of proportional representation by means of the single transferable vote (PR-STV).

History and boundaries
The constituency was created under the Electoral (Amendment) Act 2005 when the previous 5-seat Meath constituency was divided into two 3-seat constituencies of Meath East and Meath West. It was first used at the 2007 general election to the 30th Dáil. The town of Kells was moved to Meath East at the 2011 general election.

It spans the western portions of County Meath, including the towns of Trim and Navan, along with the north-eastern part of County Westmeath.

The Electoral (Amendment) (Dáil Constituencies) Act 2017 defines the constituency as:

TDs

Elections

2020 general election

2016 general election

2011 general election

2007 general election

See also
Dáil constituencies
Elections in the Republic of Ireland
Politics of the Republic of Ireland
List of Dáil by-elections
List of political parties in the Republic of Ireland

References

Dáil constituencies
Politics of County Meath
2007 establishments in Ireland
Constituencies established in 2007